The Zhongsha Islands is a Chinese term for a collection of two skerries, many entirely submerged banks, seamounts, and shoals in the South China Sea. There are in fact, no islands in the Macclesfield Bank, the main part of Zhongsha. The Scarborough Shoal, which consists of two skerries, is not contiguous with  the Macclesfield Bank but Chinese sources treat them as one chain of geographical features. The whole of the region is claimed by both the PRC and the ROC, and various bits of the eastern parts are claimed by the Philippines. No country has constant control of the whole region, and there are disputes - for example, see Scarborough Shoal standoff.

The PRC claim to administer the area as Zhongsha Daojiao Town, a town under Xisha District of the Sansha prefecture-level city in Hainan. It has one Village-level division, “Zhongsha Daojiao Residential Community”. However, the seat of this town and residential community is not within the Zhongsha Islets but, in Yongxing Town 
.

Aquaculture research has been conducted on Walker Shoal.

Geography 
The Zhongsha Islets include:

To the west, near the Paracel Islands:
 Macclesfield Bank (Zhongsha Dao)
 Walker Shoal (Manbu Ansha 漫步暗沙)

To the east, near Luzon:
 Scarborough Shoal (Nanyan Dao 南巖島 or Huangyan Dao 黃岩島)
 Nanyan skerry
 Beiyan skerry
 Truro Shoal (Sianfa Ansha or Shianfa Ansha 特魯暗沙)

To the north:
 Helen Shoal (Itung Ansha or Yitong Ansha 一統暗沙)
 Stewart Shoal (Ssu-ti-wa-erh-t'e Ansha 管事暗灘)
 Huangyan Seamount
 Shixing Seamount
 Xianbei Seamount
 Xiannan Seamount
 Zhangzhong Seamount
 Zhenbei Seamount

To the south, near the Spratly Islands:
 Dreyer Shoal (Zhongnan Ansha, 中南暗沙)
 Zhongnan Seamount
 Longnan Seamount
 Changlong Seamount

References

 
Township-level divisions of Hainan
Sansha